Weslaco High School was founded in 1921 alongside the Weslaco Independent School District, and was the first high school serving Weslaco, Texas until the construction of Weslaco East High School in fall 2000. As of today, the high school's present location has not changed since 1973. For the 2009–2010 school year, Weslaco High School is currently a TEA "Recognized" School.

Weslaco High serves the following areas: Much of Weslaco, Villa Verde, half of Olivarez, the WISD portion of Midway South, the WISD portion of Midway North, and a section of the WISD portion of Mila Doce.

Music Department
The widely recognized marching band from Weslaco High is the Weslaco Panther Corps. Originally the colors of the Corps were green and gold, but later changed to Dark Candy Purple and Crystal White to accommodate the colors of the high school.

Another department within Weslaco High is the Weslaco High Orchestra. No main colors are sported in this group, but purple is the main color over all groups and clubs within the school itself.

Bobby Lackey Stadium

From 1973 to 1989 the football stadium was named Barbee Nehaus Stadium. In 1990, a new Weslaco High stadium was built and named Panther Stadium. In recognition of one of Weslaco High's most famous students, the stadium was renamed Bobby Lackey Stadium in the summer of 2002. From 2002 onward, the 15,000-capacity Bobby Lackey Stadium has served both Weslaco High School and Weslaco East High School.

In May 2009, renovation of the stadium began to increase seating capacity as well as adding various new features to the Stadium costing an estimate of $7 Million
.   The home side seating serves 7,100 fans with approximately 1,000 seats with purple VIP backrest seating accommodations.  The visitor side bleacher seating serves approximately 6,300 fans. The lower level of the press box incorporates home and visitor independent ticket booth sales. The exterior façade has distinct arches over the first floor, thus also serving as protection to the fans from the elements.

Notable alumni

 Tom Barker, former NBA basketball player
 Harlon Block, flag raiser on Iwo Jima, World War II. He led the Panther Football Team to the Conference Championship and was an "All South Texas End.
 Pat Hingle, actor
 Bobby Lackey, former American football quarterback for the Texas Longhorns

See also

Secondary education
Secondary school
Secondary education by country
List of education articles by country
List of schools by country

References

External links

 
WISD
USNews

High schools in Hidalgo County, Texas
Public high schools in Texas